Sani Sakakini (born August 19, 1988) is a Palestinian professional basketball player. He ranks second all-time highest in the FIBA Asia Championship in scoring average, after the 2015 edition where he ranked first in scoring and rebounds (22.4 PPG and 12.6 RPG in 8 games).

Professional career
Sakakini started playing basketball at the age of 14 in the Sarriyet Ramallah club. His international career started in 2007 after he went to Applied Science University in Jordan and joined the Jordanian Premier League playing three seasons for Al Riyadi Amman. He came back to the league in 2015 to play one season with Orthodox and help the team win the title.

In 2011, Sakakini started in the minor NBL league with Guangzhou Free Man before playing in the main CBA league for four seasons with Qingdao Eagles, Jiangsu Monkey King and Tianjin Gold Lions. He started 115 games for 126 appearances, averaging 19.3 PPG and 12.5 RPG.

Sakakini played a few games in 2013 in the PBBA league for Sarriyet Ramallah and helped the team win the championship.

He also played a few games in 2014 and 2016 in the LBL league for Hoops Club and Champville SC. He started 17 games out of 17 appearances, averaging 18.4 PPG and 10.6 RPG.

For the 2017-2018 season, Sakakini joined the LPB league playing for the Trotamundos de Carabobo.

On August 29, 2021, Sakakini officially joined the Taichung Suns of the T1 League in Taiwan. On July 2, 2022, Sakakini was selected to the all-T1 League first team in 2021–22 season.

Palestinian National Team
Sakakini joined the Palestine national basketball team in 2006. He contributed in rebuilding the Palestine national basketball team with coach Jerry Steele and recruiting players such as former University of Minnesota guard Jamal Abu-Shamala. This led to the team's first ever qualification to the FIBA Asia Championship in 2015. 

In August 2021, Sakakini has announced his retirement from international basketball. The announcement came after his Palestinian team got two consecutive losses at the FIBA Asia Cup qualifiers, dropping them from the tournament.

Career statistics
Statistics from FIBA, CBA, REAL GM, EUROBASKET, SBL.

Regular season

| 2011 || Guangzhou Free Man || NBL || 20 ||  || 54.2 || 25.0 || 67.5 || 9.8 ||  || 1.1 ||  || 14.5
|-
| 2011-2012 || Qingdao DoubleStar || CBA || 31 || 27.3 || 51.6 || 16.7 || 67.4 || 8.2 || 1.3 || 1.0 || 0.3 || 10.5
|-
| 2013 || Al Riyadi Amman || JPL || 18 ||  ||  ||  ||  || 11.8 || 2.6 || 1.2 ||  || 23.9
|-
| 2013 || Sarriyet Ramallah || PBBA || 8 || || ||   ||  || 15.7 || 3.0 || 3.6 || 2.3 || 32.7
|-
| 2013-2014 || Qingdao DoubleStar || CBA || 29 || 39.4 || 51.7 || 20.8 || 75.6 || 13.8 || 2.2 || 1.5 || 0.4 || 18.9
|-
| 2014 || Hoops Club || LBL || 9 || 39.2 || 42.3 ||22.2 || 74.1 || 11.9 || 2.7 || 2.0 || 0.6 || 20.4
|-
| 2015-2016 || Jiangsu Tongxi || CBA || 30 || 42.6 || 46.2 || 20.5 || 76.3 || 14.7 || 2.4 || 1.7 || 0.4 || 23.2
|-
| 2016 || Champville SC || LBL || 8 || 31.4 || 47.2 || 00.0 || 78.4 || 9.1 || 1.9 || 1.5 || 0.1 || 16.1
|-
| 2016-2017 || Tianjin Ronggang || CBA || 35 || 41.2 || 54.5 || 33.7 || 79.6 || 13.3 || 2.0 || 1.0 || 0.3 || 24.0
|-
| 2017-2018 || Guangzhou Long-Lions || CBA || 37 || 40.1 || 52.4 || 32.3 || 85.4 || 11.7 || 2.2 || 1.3 || 0.3 || 21.2
|-
| 2018-2019 || Yulon Luxgen Dinos || SBL || 22 || 31.8 || 47.6 || 26.9 || 79.8 || 13.6 || 2.5 || 1.5 || 0.8 || 23.6
|}

International tournaments

| 2015 || Palestine || FIBA Asia Championship || 8 || 35.9 || .407 || .205 || .682 || style="background-color:#cfecec"|12.6 || 2.4 || 1.5 || 0.3 || style="background-color:#cfecec"|22.4
|}

Career highs
Sakakini scored a season high 48 points and 22 rebounds on 11/11/2015 in a 111-101 win of Jiangsu Monkey King over Tianjin Gold Lions.

Off the court
Sani Sakakini is married to Rubi Habash, point guard of Jordan's Women National Basketball Team.

He is the son of George Sakakini, former basketball player and coach, and elder brother of Salim Sakakini which also plays in the Palestine national basketball team.

References

1988 births
Living people
Basketball players at the 2006 Asian Games
Basketball players at the 2014 Asian Games
Beijing Royal Fighters players
Guangzhou Loong Lions players
Palestinian men's basketball players
Trotamundos B.B.C. players
Asian Games competitors for Palestine
Forwards (basketball)
Expatriate basketball people in Taiwan
Taichung Wagor Suns players
T1 League imports
Yulon Luxgen Dinos players
People from Ramallah
Super Basketball League imports
Kuwait SC basketball players